Defending champions Martina Hingis and Anna Kournikova defeated Nicole Arendt and Manon Bollegraf in the final, 6–2, 6–3 to win the doubles tennis title at the 2000 WTA Tour Championships. It was the last tournament in which Hingis and Kournikova played as a pair, before splitting at the beginning of the following season.

Seeds

Draw

Finals

References

External links
 Main draw (WTA)

Doubles
2000 WTA Tour